The Amytzantarioi or Amytzantarantes (Αμυτζανταράνται) were  one of the most prominent groups in the history of the Empire of Trebizond in the civil wars of the mid-14th century, but their nature is disputed among scholars, with some considering them an aristocratic family, and others an ethnic group.

References

Sources
 

People of the Empire of Trebizond
Greek noble families
Laz people
Byzantine families